Delichoban (Dəliçoban) is a rural locality (a selo) in Derbentsky District, Republic of Dagestan, Russia. The population was 2,217 as of 2010. The village has an Azerbaijani-majority. There are 30 streets.

Geography 
Delichoban is located 26 km northwest of Derbent (the district's administrative centre) by road. Velikent and Padar are the nearest rural localities.

References 

Rural localities in Derbentsky District